Charles Alexander John Piesse (11 September 1812 – 6 March 1851) was an English civil servant who served briefly as the Colonial Secretary of Western Australia. He was an older brother of George William Septimus Piesse.

In 1840 Piesse was appointed Secretary to the Central Loan Fund Board of Ireland, and the following year published a book about the loan fund system. He held this position until appointed Colonial Secretary of Western Australia in 1850. He arrived at Fremantle in October 1850 and died in office several months later, on 6 March 1851.

References 

1812 births
1851 deaths
Colonial Secretaries of Western Australia